Aikshaw is a hamlet in the civil parish of Holme St. Cuthbert in Cumbria, United Kingdom. It is located approximately one-and-a-half miles north-west of the village of Westnewton, and three miles east of the village of Mawbray. Jericho is located approximately one mile to the east, with Edderside approximately a mile further to the south-east. Mealrigg is located half-a-mile to the south. Carlisle, Cumbria's county town, is located approximately twenty-two-and-a-half miles to the north-west. Aikshaw lies on the B5301 road, which runs from Silloth-on-Solway in the east via Tarns, Westnewton, and Aspatria to the A595 between Cockermouth and Bothel.

Etymology
The name of Aikshaw is derived from the Old English eik-sceaga, meaning an oak wood. Archaic variant spellings include Aykesom,  Aikeshawehil, and Aikeshaw.

References

Hamlets in Cumbria
Holme St Cuthbert